Regan Yee (born 4 July 1995) is a Canadian athlete. She competed in the women's 3000 metres steeplechase event at the 2019 World Athletics Championships and Tokyo Olympics.

References

External links
 
 Athletics Canada profile for Regan Yee
 CBC News article of Canadian steeplechase record
 2018 Trinity Western University Regan Yee Track and Field profile

1995 births
Living people
Canadian female middle-distance runners
Canadian female steeplechase runners
Canadian female track and field athletes
Sportspeople from British Columbia
World Athletics Championships athletes for Canada
Athletes (track and field) at the 2020 Summer Olympics
Olympic track and field athletes of Canada